Edwin Nolte (January 27, 1885 - December 14, 1940) was an American politician from St. Louis, Missouri, who was elected to the Missouri Senate in 1930.  He was educated at the St. Louis area Smith Academy.

References

1885 births
1940 deaths
Republican Party Missouri state senators
20th-century American politicians